The Men's heptathlon event at the 2013 European Athletics Indoor Championships was held on March 2–3.

Records

Results

60 metres

Long jump

Shot put

High jump

60 metres hurdles

Pole vault

1000 metres

Final standings

References

Combined events at the European Athletics Indoor Championships
2013 European Athletics Indoor Championships